Stănuleasa may refer to several villages in Romania:

 Stănuleasa, a village in Sâmburești Commune, Olt County
 Stănuleasa, a village in Vitomirești Commune, Olt County

See also 
 Stan (surname)